Oren Bloedow (born July 3, 1965) is an American singer, guitarist and bassist. He founded the band Elysian Fields in 1995 with Jennifer Charles. His father, Jerry Bloedow, was a playwright, poet, and film editor whose theater, the Hardware Poet's Playhouse, participated in the New York avant-garde scene in the 1950s and 1960s.

Career
Bloedow's first musical affiliations were with Phillip Johnston, Bobby Previte, and Wayne Horvitz, all of whom worked with him in Bobby Radcliff's blues band in the 1980s. With Radcliff, Bloedow backed up Dr. John, Otis Rush, Johnny Copeland and  Paul Butterfield. Another close collaboration was with guitarist Ron Anderson of The Molecules. In 1985 a friend of Anderson's introduced Bloedow to 101 Crustaceans, whose leader, Ed Pastorini, is Bloedow's oldest continuing musical associate and was a member of Elysian Fields. Bloedow names Pastorini as his favorite musician.

He attended New England Conservatory in 1987–88, studying with Ran Blake and David Holland.  Returning to New York City he joined the community forming at the Knitting Factory which included Previte, Horvitz, and Johnston. In 1990 he coupled up with Knitting Factory employee Charles, who became his songwriting and performing partner.  In this period Oren toured on bass for The Lounge Lizards, recording the John Lurie and the Lounge Lizards Live in Berlin 1991 concert film and album.  Albums with Columbia recording artists Brenda Kahn and Dog's Eye View followed.  In 1995, his musical project with Charles, now called Elysian Fields, was signed to Radioactive Records.  He also recorded an album with close friends Medeski, Martin and Wood for Knitting Factory Records in this period. 

In the 2000's Oren worked extensively with V2/Commotion Records artist Chocolate Genius, contributing to the albums GodMusic and Black Yankee Rock.  A Chocolate Genius tour opening for Meshell Ndegeocello brought Oren to that artist's attention, and he played in her band frequently in that decade, working on Comfort Woman, The World Has Made Me The Man Of My Dreams, and Devil's Halo. 

In 2009 Oren joined members of Antibalas and Director Bill T Jones in creating the Tony award-winning Broadway musical Fela!, based on the life and work of Fela Kuti.  That production closed at the end of 2010, but the touring version traveled the world for some time afterwards, including a return to the home of Afrobeat, Lagos Nigeria, for which Oren was present.

Another theater project included Bloedow along with Matmos, Gael Rakotondrabe and Doug Wieselman as the pit band under composer/lyricist Anohni, then called Antony Hegarty, on the Robert Wilson spectacle The Life and Death of Marina Abramovic, starring Willem Dafoe and the performance artist Abramovic as herself.  A co-production of the Manchester International Festival in the UK, New York's Armory and the Teatro Real Madrid, the piece was performed in all of those cities between 2011 and 2013, as well as Amsterdam, Antwerp and Basel.

Since the 2010's Oren has composed and recorded several long-form dance pieces, two with Jennifer Charles and one with the poet Christina Clark, for the Paris-based dance group Affairi Esteri.  With Shlomi Tuizer of that team, He co-led a workshop at the Abbaye at Royaumount for composers and choreographers in 2015.

In 2015, Oren opened The Owl Music Parlor in Brooklyn, which he books and usually runs singlehanded.  Like the Knitting Factory and Tonic, venues that Oren gravitated to as a young musician, The Owl has proved a hub for a thriving musical community and earned a worldwide reputation as a destination for great music.

With Jennifer Charles, he was a headline act the Jewish Culture Festival in Kraków in 2005 and 2015 as La Mar Enfortuna.

Oren Bloedow Recording/ Performing Credits

Universal (/various) Recording Artists Elysian Fields, Co-leader

The Lounge Lizards  (R,P)

Bruce Springsteen.  (P)

Warner/Verve (etc) Recording Artist Meshell Ndegeocello. (R, P/ extensive touring)

Jazz notables such as Bill Frisell, Roy Hargrove, Jason Moran, Robert Glasper, Chris Dave and more

Verve Recording Artist Lizz Wright (R/P/ touring), Jewel (R, P, tv), Norah Jones (P), Regina Spektor   (R)

Badly Drawn Boy (P)
Emmylou Harris.  (P)
Lou Reed (P)
Sony Artists Jeff Buckley (P), Dog’s Eye VIew (R, P), Brenda Kahn (R,P touring

(Irish Superstar Glen Hansard (R,P) Martha Wainwright (P - touring), Rufus Wainwright (P - touring), Kate and Anna McGarrigle (P, musical direction Tegan and Sara (P)

Metropolitan Opera Composer  / Nonesuch Recording Artist Nico Muhly. (P, touring), Nonesuch Recording Artist Thomas Bartlett (R,P, touring), V2 Recording Artist Chocolate Genius (R, P, Musical Direction)

Blues/R&B practitioners Otis Rush, Dr. John, Paul Butterfield, Johnny Copeland, Jimmy Vivino, Sean Pelton. (P)

Nigerian artists Femi (and Seun) Kuti (P), Ethiopian Superstar Aster Aweke
Guitar Chair:  Fela! On Broadway with Antibalas (Theater work)
Guitar and Bass with Anohni (Antony and The Johnsons (R,P)
Robert Wilson’s Life And Death of Marina Abramovic, with Willem Dafoe (and M.A.)  (Theater work)
‘Downtown' music legends John Zorn, Marc Ribot, Sex Mob, Dave Douglas, etc.
Folk Artists Sam Amidon (Nonesuch) (R,P), Mark O’Connor, Larry Campbell, Martin Hayes (P)
M. Ward. (P)
Stephanie Mills (P)
Bilal (P)
David Hidalgo of Los Lobos (P, orchestration)
Dreamworks Rec Artist E. (of Eels) (P, orchestration)

Discography
 Oren Bloedow (Knitting Factory, 1992)
 Luckiest Boy in the World (Knitting Factory, 1998)
 La Mar Enfortuna (Tzadik, 2001)

References

American male singers
Singers from New York City
1965 births
Living people
Tzadik Records artists
Guitarists from New York City
20th-century American bass guitarists
American male bass guitarists
20th-century American male musicians
The Lounge Lizards members
Knitting Factory Records artists